Woman's Hour is a radio magazine programme broadcast in the United Kingdom on the BBC Light Programme, BBC Radio 2, and later BBC Radio 4. It has been on the air since 1946.

History
Created by Norman Collins and originally presented by Alan Ivimey, Woman's Hour was first broadcast on 7 October 1946 on the BBC's Light Programme. Janet Quigley, who was also involved with the birth of the UK radio programme Today, has been credited with "virtually creating" the programme.

The programme was transferred to its current home in 1973. Over the years it has been presented by Mary Hill (19461963), Joan Griffiths (19471949), Olive Shapley (19491953), Jean Metcalfe (19501968), Violet Carson (19521956), Marjorie Anderson (19581972), Teresa McGonagle (19581976), Judith Chalmers (19661970), Sue MacGregor (19721987), Jenni Murray (1987–2020), Martha Kearney (1998 to March 2007), and Jane Garvey (8 October 2007 to December 2020). Fill-in presenters have included Andrea Catherwood, Sangita Myska, Sheila McClennon, Carolyn Quinn, Jane Little, Ritula Shah, Oona King, and Amanda Platell. In September 2020 it was announced that Emma Barnett would become the lead presenter of Woman's Hour after the retirement of Jenni Murray, who presented her final edition on 1 October 2020. Barnett, who had been a fill-in presenter a number of times previously, became the youngest woman to regularly present the programme in January 2021. Anita Rani became the successor to Garvey as the second presenter in the same month.

In the early years the topics for the programme were arranged well in advance and printed in the Radio Times but by the 1980s there was a change to greater topicality. Clare Selerie-Gray became the producer in 1987 and steered the programme away from its tendency to include merely whimsical topics and ensured that the books read in the last section were more relevant to women's lives rather than ordinary novels. She responded to criticism that the programme was too feminist by asserting that it avoided "Spare Rib didactics" but that a feminist influence on the people who made it had occurred.

On 31 December 2004, the show became Man's Hour for one day only, on which it was presented by Channel 4 News anchor Jon Snow. On 18 July 2010, after 64 years of Woman's Hour, the BBC began broadcasting a full series called Men's Hour on BBC Radio 5 Live, presented by Tim Samuels.

For one week in April 2014, the programme was guest edited by J. K. Rowling, Kelly Holmes, Naomi Alderman, Doreen Lawrence and Lauren Laverne. It was the first time the programme had a guest editor since its initial decade of broadcast. In September 2015, the programme hosted "Woman's Hour Takeover" with a week of guest editors, including Kim Cattrall, Nimko Ali, Rachel Treweek, Michelle Mone and Jacqueline Wilson.

Late Night Woman's Hour, a spinoff series, was launched in 2015, presented by Lauren Laverne. The series is broadcast in an 11pm timeslot and each episode takes a single topic for discussion.
The lateness of the broadcast allows for more freedom to handle topics considered unsuitable for the morning broadcast.

The programme has an annual "power list" of highly achieving women. The annual power list is determined by a panel of judges.

On 18 March 2011, Woman's Hour was the first live broadcast from the new dock10 studios at Media City in Salford.

In October 2016, it was recorded that the programme has 3.7 million listeners weekly and is the second most popular daily podcast across BBC Radio. A quarter of its audience were reported to be under 35 and 40% male. In 2013, the programme had 3.9 million listeners, 14% of whom were men. In 2006 it had 2.7 million listeners.

Format
The bulk of the programme has always consisted of reports, interviews and debates on health, education, cultural and political topics aimed at women and mothers. However, until 2021 these occupied only the first 45 minutes of the hour. The final 15 minutes consisted of more lightweight entertainment, usually fiction, still broadly directed at women. Prior to 1998, this slot featured readings. From 1998 to 2021 it featured short-run drama serials, known initially as Woman's Hour Drama and later as 15 Minute Drama. One of the most popular of these was the recurring Ladies of Letters serial, starring Prunella Scales and Patricia Routledge. The drama slot was dropped in 2021, since when the full hour of Woman's Hour has been given over to reports and interviews etc.

Schedule
Woman's Hour has been broadcast at 10am Monday to Friday since James Boyle's revision of the Radio 4 schedules in April 1998.  Between September 1991 and April 1998 it was broadcast at 10:30am, having previously gone out for many years in an early afternoon slot (2pm).  The programme's move to a morning slot was unpopular among some listeners who, for family or other reasons, work only in the morning. Michael Green, the then controller of Radio 4, made his decision the previous year and considered the elimination of the programme title. Weekend Woman's Hour is broadcast on Saturday afternoons at 4pm, features highlights of the previous week introduced by one of the presenters and lasts almost an hour. Additionally, episodes are made available as a podcast following the broadcast of each programme.

Music
In its earlier years, it used a variety of popular light classics as signature tunes, including such pieces as H. Elliott-Smith's Wanderlust (Waltz), Anthony Collins' Vanity Fair, and the lively Overture from Gabriel Fauré's Masques et Bergamasques.  From the early 1970s, specially composed pieces were used, several of which were provided by the BBC Radiophonic Workshop.

There is also a band called Woman's Hour, based in the UK and signed to the record label Secretly Canadian, who took their name from the radio show.

Controversies

Breach of BBC impartiality rules
A listener complained about the 1 October 2018, edition of Woman's Hour, which featured an item discussing the nomination of Judge Brett Kavanaugh to the US Supreme Court.  The feature included an interview with a law professor who had worked with Anita Hill, in her pursuit of a sexual harassment complaint against an earlier nominee, Judge Clarence Thomas. The listener believed that allusions to the earlier case were immaterial and prejudicial, that the selection of interviewee was biased, and that presenter Jane Garvey had expressed her personal view on a controversial topic.

The BBC Executive Complaints Unit partially upheld the listener's complaint, stating that Garvey gave the impression of sympathising with the interviewee's viewpoint, and "did not challenge the interviewee in a manner which would have ensured due impartiality". As a result, the Woman’s Hour team and production staff attended a briefing on impartiality.

Sinead O'Connor
In 2021 Emma Barnett interviewed Sinéad O'Connor on Woman's Hour, during which Barnett mentioned a recent comment by a music critic referring to O'Connor as "the crazy woman in pop's attic". O'Connor felt that bringing this up was "unnecessary and hurtful". The interview prompted O'Connor to announce she was quitting music, though she later retracted this, stating that Barnett had been to blame:

Feminism
Woman's Hour presenter Jenni Murray is a former patron of the charity Women's Aid and is president of the Fawcett Society.

In April 2014, Radio 4's Roger Bolton noted on the BBC's Feedback Blog: "As you well know BBC programmes are supposed to be impartial but I'm not sure if that can be said of Woman’s Hour, at least when it comes to feminism. Woman's Hour is in fact a powerful advocate for women’s empowerment and this week as part of that campaign it produced its second power list."

Awards and nominations

See also 
Late Night Woman's Hour
Woman's Hour Drama

References

External links

 
 

BBC Light Programme programmes
BBC Radio 2 programmes
BBC Radio 4 programmes
Women's mass media
Women in the United Kingdom
1946 radio programme debuts